Íþróttafélagið Huginn (ÍF Huginn) is an Icelandic football club from the town of Seyðisfjörður. The team is currently fielding a merged senior squad with Höttur from Egilsstaðir named Höttur/Huginn, which plays in the 3. deild karla, the 4th tier of Icelandic football.

Current squad

External links